"Wsród nocnej ciszy" (Polish for "In the midst of night's quiet") is a popular Polish Christmas carol from the turn of 18th and 19th centuries.

The Australian poet, Peter Skrzynecki, has a poem titled "Wśród nocnej ciszy" (p. 102 of his Old World/New World anthology), which puts forward the idea that sometimes the real meaning of Christmas is lost, amongst our many Christmas cultural traditions.

See also
Christmas in Poland
List of Christmas carols

Christmas carols
Polish songs
Polish-language songs
Christmas in Poland
19th-century hymns
Year of song unknown